The greater melampitta (Megalampitta gigantea) is a species of bird in the family Melampittidae. It is the only species in the genus Megalampitta, although it was once placed in the genus Melampitta with the lesser melampitta.  Formerly classified as a bird-of-paradise, the little-known greater melampitta has an uncertain taxonomy and is sometimes believed to be affiliated to pitohuis, as it appears to be poisonous to eat (Frith and Beehler 1998).
It is found in New Guinea.
Its natural habitats are subtropical or tropical moist lowland forests and subtropical or tropical moist montane forests.

References

greater melampitta
Birds of New Guinea
greater melampitta
Taxonomy articles created by Polbot